Nagourney is a surname. Notable people with the surname include:

 Adam Nagourney (born 1954), American journalist
 Sarah Nagourney, American songwriter